Fuentealbilla is a village and municipality in the province of Albacete, Castile-La Mancha, Spain. It is located to the northeast of the city of Albacete and had a population of 2,071 in 2009.

Former Spain international footballer Andrés Iniesta was born in Fuentealbilla.

References

External links 

Official website of Fuentealbilla

Municipalities of the Province of Albacete